Walter Scott Montgomery House is a historic home located at Spartanburg, Spartanburg County, South Carolina.  It was designed by architect George Franklin Barber and built in 1909. It is a -story, frame, yellow brick-veneer residence in the Colonial Revival style. building is of frame construction with a yellow brick veneer and a red tile roof. It features a distinctive portico and leaded glass windows. Also on the property is a one-story, reinforced concrete auto garage (c. 1923).

It was listed on the National Register of Historic Places in 1984.

References

Houses on the National Register of Historic Places in South Carolina
Colonial Revival architecture in South Carolina
Houses completed in 1909
Houses in Spartanburg, South Carolina
National Register of Historic Places in Spartanburg, South Carolina